2K6 may refer to:

 the year 2006
 2K6 Luna, Soviet short-range artillery rocket complex
 College Hoops 2K6, 2005 video game
 Major League Baseball 2K6, 2006 video game
 NBA 2K6, 2005 video game
 NHL 2K6, 2005 video game